Hibbertia brevipedunculata is a species of flowering plant in the family Dilleniaceae and is endemic to northern Australia. It is a sub-shrub with hairy foliage, linear to lance-shaped leaves with the narrow end towards the base, and yellow flowers arranged singly on the ends of branches or short side shoots, with thirty to forty-four stamens arranged in bundles around the two carpels.

Description
There are thirty to forty-four stamens arranged in bundles around the two carpels, each carpel with four ovules. Flowering mainly occurs from December to June.

Taxonomy
Hibbertia brevipedunculata was first formally described in 2010 by Hellmut R. Toelken in the Journal of the Adelaide Botanic Gardens from specimens collected by Norman Byrnes in the Adelaide River area in 1972. The specific epithet (brevipedunculata) means "short-pedunculate".

Distribution and habitat
This hibbertia grows in woodland, often in soil derived from sandstone or granite, and occurs in north-western Western Australia and central northern Northern Territory. It is widespread in the Daly River region.

Conservation status
Goodenia brevipedunculata is classified as "least concern" under the Northern Territory Government Territory Parks and Wildlife Conservation Act 1976.

See also
List of Hibbertia species

References

brevipedunculata
Eudicots of Western Australia
Flora of the Northern Territory
Plants described in 2010
Taxa named by Hellmut R. Toelken